was a town located in Higashiyatsushiro District, Yamanashi Prefecture, Japan.

As of 2003, the town had an estimated population of 8,540 and a density of 333.20 persons per km². The total area was 25.63 km².

History 
On October 12, 2004, Yatsushiro, along with the towns of Ichinomiya, Isawa and Misaka, the village of Sakaigawa (all from Higashiyatsushiro District), and the town of Kasugai (from Higashiyamanashi District), was merged to create the city of Fuefuki.

External links
Official website of Fuefuki in Japanese (English portions)

Dissolved municipalities of Yamanashi Prefecture
Fuefuki, Yamanashi